Jagannath Sitaram Akarte was a leader of Congress(I) from Amravati, Maharashtra, India. He was a lawyer by profession and was a member of the Rajya Sabha from 5 July 1980 to 4 July 1986.

He was born on 14 September 1906 and married to Shrimati Shantabai Akarte. He was also a Member of the Maharashtra Legislative Council from 1962 to 1968.

He was survived by six sons and one daughter.

References

People from Amravati
1906 births
Members of the Maharashtra Legislative Council
Rajya Sabha members from Maharashtra
Year of death missing
Marathi politicians